Jackson Gladwin Thompson (born 7 February 1986) is an Indian born cricketer who has represented Oman at under-17 level. He is a left-handed batsman and a right-arm offbreak bowler who currently plays for Unicorns, have previously played a handful of games for Gloucestershire. Thompson was born in Maharashtra. 

Thompson made his first-class debut for the team in a County Championship match against Middlesex - though the match finished in an innings defeat for the Gloucestershire team. Thompson contributed 11 runs in the first-innings and 21 runs in the second-innings to the Gloucestershire total.  Thompson made his Twenty20 debut in the 2008 competition.  In 2010, Thompson was selected as one of 21 players to form the first Unicorns squad to take part in the Clydesdale Bank 40 domestic limited overs competition against the regular first-class counties. The Unicorns were made up of 15 former county cricket professionals and 6 young cricketers looking to make it in the professional game.

References

External links
Jackson Thompson at Cricket Archive
Jackson Thompson at Cricinfo

1986 births
Indian cricketers
Living people
Cricketers from Maharashtra
Gloucestershire cricketers
Unicorns cricketers
Omani cricketers
Gloucestershire Cricket Board cricketers
Middlesex cricketers
Oxfordshire cricketers
Indian emigrants to Oman
Indian expatriates in Oman